Kh-32 is a Russian supersonic air-launched cruise missile with a range of 600–1000 km developed by the MKB Raduga from the Kh-22. The missile was accepted to service in 2016 as armament for the Tu-22M3M bombers.

History 
Work on the deep modernization of the Kh-22 missile began in the late 1980s, due to the low immunity of its guidance radar operating at fixed frequencies. When the enemy was using radar jamming, the launch of the Kh-22 was impossible.

State contract number 01133 for development work on the topic "Adaptation" was signed in 19 June 1990. Due to the general crisis in the country and insufficient financing, work on the topic was suspended several times. In 1998, the first missile tests were carried out on the basis of the 929th GLITS, and further work was stopped due to lack of funding from the Tupolev Design Bureau for the modernization of the aircraft-carrier.

On 7 March 2008, Contract No. 83042 was signed with the Raduga State Committee for Design and Development for testing prototypes of 9-A-2362 missiles with TK-56 missiles until 25 November 2011. OJSC Tupolev was to re-equip one combat aircraft Tu-22M3 for testing within the framework of the topic Adaptation-45.03M.

Based on the Resolution of the Council of Ministers of Russia No. 1080-31 December 2010 on the state defense order for 2011 and its planned period for 2012–2013, the Tu-22M3 aircraft board No. 9804 / head No. 4898649 as part of the modernization of the Tu-22M3 fleet was reequipped with pilot production of the OKB Design Bureau named after A.N. Tupolev (topic "Potential") for testing air-to-ground missiles 9-A-2362. Flight tests of the aircraft with missiles were conducted at the end of July 2013. Several flights have been completed, including at least one flight with missile launches.

As of August 2016, at Tactical Missile Armament Corporation (which includes MKB Raduga), the research on the product continued. It was also confirmed that the product is in a high degree of technical readiness.

At the end of 2016 the Kh-32 missile officially adopted. Planned modernization of 30 aircraft  Tu-22M3 in the Tu-22M3M version.

Design

The main differences from the Kh-22 
The Kh-32 missile is made in the Kh-22 case and their geometrical dimensions are completely identical.

Installed another, more powerful engine.
A new interference-free radar inertial guidance system with radio command correction and reference to the terrain (from altimeter) was installed.
Instead of autopilot installed automatic control system.

Its maximum range of 620 miles (997 kilometers) means it can be launched outside the maximum range of US Navy F/A-18 Super Hornets, which have a maximum combat radius of around 550 miles (885 kilometers).

Penetration of missile defense systems 
Konstantin Sivkov believes that Kh-32 possesses powerful means of breaking through the missile defense system of Aegis Combat System, equipped with Standard Missile 6 missiles:
 The Kh-32 on the final stage attacks the target in a steep dive (breaking the missile defense against radars that do not include objects directly above themselves in their viewing angle);
 Multi-frequency radar in Kh-32 has better resistance to  EW such as spot jamming

Sources and literature 
 Karpenko, A.V.; BTS "Bastion".
 Aviation and Astronautics, № 5, 1996.

References

Nuclear air-to-surface missiles
Kh-032
Kh-032
MKB Raduga products
Military equipment introduced in the 2010s